Lankascincus is a genus of lizards, commonly known as lanka skinks and tree skinks, in the family Scincidae. The genus is endemic to Sri Lanka.

Species
The genus Lankascincus comprises nine species.

Lankascincus deignani  – Deignan's tree skink
Lankascincus dorsicatenatus 
Lankascincus fallax  – Peters's tree skink
Lankascincus gansi  – Gans's tree skink, Gans's lankaskink

Lankascincus merrill  – Merrill's lanka skink
Lankascincus sameerai  – Sameera's lanka skink
Lankascincus sripadensis  – Sripada forest skink
Lankascincus taprobanensis  – Ceylon tree skink
Lankascincus taylori  – Taylor's tree skink

Nota bene: A binomial authority in parentheses indicates that the species was originally described in a genus other than Lankascincus.

References

External links
Greer AE (1991). "Lankascincus, a New Genus of Scincid Lizards from Sri Lanka, with Descriptions of Three New Species". Journal of Herpetology 25 (1): 59–64. .
Batuwita S, Pethiyagoda R (2007). "Description of a new species of litter skink (Squamata: Scincidae: Lankascincus)". Ceylon Journal of Science (Biological Sciences) 36 (2): 80–87. . (Lankascincus greeri, new species).

 
Lizard genera
Taxa named by Allen Eddy Greer